Louis Trauth Dairy was founded in 1920 by the senior Louis Trauth. It was based in Newport, Kentucky, USA. It began from a  plant and competed with 54 other dairies in the Greater Cincinnati area. It had a modern facility covering five city blocks. There had been three multimillion-dollar expansions since 1985 to provide more efficient production and distribution of dairy products. Trauth Dairy was one of the first dairies in the area to vacuum pasteurize milk, and the first in Cincinnati to introduce tamper-evident packaging for sour cream, cottage cheese and dips. Trauth Dairy was the sole manufacturer of Fat Free plus a/B milk.

In 1997, the company was sold to Suiza Food Corp for an undisclosed price. It came under the Dean Foods brand in 2001 after the company merged with Suiza Food.

In 2011, the dairy closed after 91 years in business.

References

Defunct companies based in Kentucky
Buildings and structures in Campbell County, Kentucky
Newport, Kentucky
Cuisine of Cincinnati
Dairy products companies of the United States
Dean Foods brands
2011 disestablishments in Kentucky
1920 establishments in Kentucky
American companies established in 1920